Jesper Nelin (born 3 October 1992) is a Swedish biathlete. He competed in the World Cup, and represented Sweden during the 2016 World Championships in Oslo, Norway.

His Olympic results include winning a gold medal in the biathlon relay in 2018 with the Swedish team, along with Peppe Femling, Sebastian Samuelsson, and Fredrik Lindström.

Biathlon results

Olympic results
1 medal (1 gold)

World Championships

*During Olympic seasons, competitions are only held for those events not included in the Olympic program.

References

External links

1992 births
Living people
Swedish male biathletes
Biathletes at the 2018 Winter Olympics
Biathletes at the 2022 Winter Olympics
Olympic biathletes of Sweden
Medalists at the 2018 Winter Olympics
Olympic medalists in biathlon
Olympic gold medalists for Sweden
People from Värnamo Municipality
Biathlon World Championships medalists
Sportspeople from Jönköping County